R318 road may refer to:
 R318 road (South Africa)
 R318 road (Ireland), a regional road of Ireland